Frederick Anthony Vivian Parker (11 February 1913 – 26 May 1988) was an English first-class cricketer. Parker was a right-handed batsman who bowled right-arm medium pace.

Parker made his first-class debut for Hampshire against the touring Indians in 1946, which was the first season after the Second World War. Parker played made his final appearance for Hampshire in the same season against Kent.

In the same year Parker made three first-class appearances for the Combined Services, making his debut against Northamptonshire where he scored his maiden and only first-class century, making 177 runs before being run out. Parker played two more matches for the Combined Services against Surrey and Worcestershire.

In 1949 Parker represented Devon in the Minor Counties Championship, where he played two against the Surrey Second XI and Cornwall.

Parker died at Plymouth, Devon on 26 May 1988.

Family
Parker's father William Parker represented the Marylebone Cricket Club in two first-class matches in 1913. Parker's father-in-law Charles Farmer also represented the Marylebone Cricket Club, playing in two first-class matches.

External links
Frederick Parker at Cricinfo
Frederick Parker at CricketArchive

1913 births
1988 deaths
People from Westminster
Cricketers from Greater London
English cricketers
Hampshire cricketers
Combined Services cricketers
Devon cricketers